The 2009 Oschersleben Formula Two round was the sixth round of the 2009 FIA Formula Two Championship season. It was held on 5 and 6 September 2009 at Motorsport Arena Oschersleben at Oschersleben, Germany. The first race was won by Andy Soucek, with Mirko Bortolotti and Kazim Vasiliauskas also on the podium. The second race was won by Mikhail Aleshin, with Andy Soucek and Julien Jousse also on the podium.

Classification

Qualifying 1
Weather/Track: Sun 19°/Dry 21°

Qualifying 2
Weather/Track: Cloud 15°/Wet 15°

Race 1
Weather/Track: Cloud 17°/Dry 22°

Race 2
Weather/Track: Cloud 15°/Dry 18°

Standings after the race
Drivers' Championship standings

References

FIA Formula Two Championship